A.O. Peristeri F.C. is a Greek football club, based in Peristeri, Attica.

History
The club was founded in 1967 after a merger of three teams of Athenian suburb: Thyella Peristeri, A.O Taksiarchon and Ethnikos Peristeri. They will play in Football League 2 for the season 2013–14. The club uses the E.A.K. Hephaestus stadium, located near the Anthoupoli metro station.

Honours

Domestic
 Athens Champions: 2
 1991–92, 2009–10
 Athens Cup Winners: 1
 1981-82

Football clubs in Attica
Football clubs in Athens
Association football clubs established in 1967
1967 establishments in Greece